Eric Underwood is an American British ballet dancer, model and actor. He was a soloist with The Royal Ballet, he left the company in August 2017.  He was one of the few black dancers in the company.

Early life
Underwood was born in Washington, D.C., and was raised at a poor suburb in Maryland. He has two paternal half siblings. There were gangs violence and gun crimes in the neighborhood, but Underwood stated "we were loved and appreciated at home." He also stated police officers would visit his school once a week to build "positive association" with police.

Underwood danced at home as a child, but did not start formal trainings until he turned 14. His mother wanted to send him to study acting at Suitland High School Center for Visual and Performing Arts, as it was "more promising" than mainstream schools, but Underwood got stage fright at his audition. As he was leaving, he saw a ballet class and asked the teacher to let him try. He ended up training at the school as a ballet student and was one of the few boys in the class. A year later, he received a scholarship to train at School of American Ballet in New York City, where he was the only African-American student in his class. He graduated in 2000.

Career
Underwood joined the Dance Theater of Harlem after he graduated, and became a soloist by the end of his first season. He joined the American Ballet Theatre in 2003, where he and Misty Copeland were the only black dancers. In 2006, he joined The Royal Ballet in London as a First Artist, having previously been spotted while he was on tour in London. During his first season, he originated roles in Wayne McGregor's Chroma and Christopher Wheeldon's DGV: Danse à grande vitesse. He was promoted to soloist in 2008, and continued to work with Wheeldon and McGregor, and created roles in productions such as Aeternum, Alice's Adventures in Wonderland, Infra and Woolf Works. He had also participated in the Royal Ballet's community outreach program. Throughout his time in the Royal Ballet, he was one of the few black dancers in the company. In 2017, Underwood left the company.

In 2015, Underwood posted a video of him applying make up to ballet shoes, as there were only pink and beige options. He then worked with Bloch, a ballet shoes manufacturer to produce ballet shoes that match dancers of color's skin-tones.

In 2019, Underwood played Admetus in Cats, the film adaptation of the musical of the same name. He appeared in many dance sequences but had no spoken lines. He was set to play Albert/Kevin in the 2020 revival of the play Clybourne Park in Park Theatre, London, though its entire run was delayed due to the 2019-20 coronavirus pandemic. Underwood is also a model.

Selected repertoire
Underwood's repertoire with American Ballet Theatre and The Royal Ballet includes:

After the Rain pas de deux
Afternoon of a Faun
Agon
Rasputin in Anastasia
High Brahmin in La Bayadère
Officer in Cinderella
The Four Temperaments
Gaoler and Gentleman in Manon
Serenade
Von Rothbart in Swan Lake
Apollo in Sylvia
Mrs Pettitoes in Tales of Beatrix Potter

Created roles
DGV: Danse à grande vitesse
Acis and Galatea
Aeternum
The Caterpillar in Alice's Adventures in Wonderland
Chroma
Electric Counterpoint
Infra
Live Fire Exercise
Multiverse
Obsidian Tear
Raven Girl
Tetractys
Woolf Works

Personal life
Underwood is a naturalised British citizen.

References

Living people
African-American ballet dancers
Dancers of The Royal Ballet
American male ballet dancers
African-American male dancers
Dance Theatre of Harlem dancers
Year of birth missing (living people)
Dancers from Maryland
American emigrants to England
American Ballet Theatre dancers
School of American Ballet alumni
21st-century American ballet dancers
1980s births